Sosnovka is a rural locality (a village) in Meselinsky Selsoviet, Aurgazinsky District, Bashkortostan, Russia. The population was 58 as of 2010. There is 1 street.

Geography 
Sosnovka is located 32 km south of Tolbazy (the district's administrative centre) by road. Dadanovka is the nearest rural locality.

References 

Rural localities in Aurgazinsky District